Portugal competed at the 2020 Winter Youth Olympics in Lausanne, Switzerland from 9 to 22 January 2020.

Alpine skiing

Boys

Girls

See also
Portugal at the 2020 Summer Olympics

References 

Nations at the 2020 Winter Youth Olympics
Portugal at the Youth Olympics